"Everybody's Crazy 'Bout My Baby" is a song recorded by American country music artist Marie Osmond.  It was released in April 1987 as the third single from the album I Only Wanted You.  The song reached #24 on the Billboard Hot Country Singles & Tracks chart.  The song was written by Mike Reid.

Chart performance

References

1987 singles
1986 songs
Marie Osmond songs
Songs written by Mike Reid (singer)
Song recordings produced by Paul Worley
Capitol Records singles
Curb Records singles